Cyperus nanus, commonly known as the Indian flatsedge, is a species of sedge that is native to eastern parts of Mexico  and islands of the Caribbean.

See also 
 List of Cyperus species

References 

nanus
Plants described in 1797
Flora of Mexico
Flora of Aruba
Flora of Cuba
Flora of the Dominican Republic
Flora of Haiti
Flora of Jamaica
Flora of Puerto Rico
Taxa named by Carl Ludwig Willdenow
Flora without expected TNC conservation status